The 1984 PBA Invitational Championship was the third conference of the 1984 PBA season. It started on November 18 and ended on December 18, 1984. Imports return to action after two All-Filipino conferences.

Format
The following format will be observed for the duration of the tournament:
 Five teams qualified in the Invitational championship. Gold Eagle Beer gained the 5th entry over Tanduay Rhum Makers based on their won-loss records in the elimination round of the first two conferences.  The Beermen had nine wins and 16 losses compared to Tanduay's seven wins and 18 losses combined slates despite the Rhum Makers making it to the semifinals of the second All-Filipino Conference.  
 The top two teams at the end of the double-round eliminations advance to the best-of-five finals. The third and fourth-place finishers play in the best-of-five series for third place.

Qualification
These are win–loss records from the two All-Filipino conferences' elimination rounds this season:

Elimination round

Third place playoffs

Finals

The Coffee Makers were ahead by only seven, 89-82, going into the final period, Ricardo Brown hit nine points in an 11-2 blast as their lead ballooned to 14 points, 100-86. Import Jeff Collins took over the scoring chores and came up with an eight-point run for Great Taste to decide the issue, 114-92.

The Redmanizers took a 75-71 lead in the third quarter, after trailing the Coffee Makers throughout the game. In the fourth period, after a three-point play by Freddie Hubalde to tie the count at 90-all, a 9-2 run by Great Taste, resulted to a seven-point spread with nine minutes left in the ballgame. Going into the last two minutes of play, Jeff Collins' reverse dunk gave the Coffee Makers a five-point lead but Freddie Hubalde's two unanswered baskets bring the Great Taste' lead to only one with 1:05 to go. Ricardo Brown scored two-for-two from the stripe after being hacked by Carlton Willis, 117-114 for Great Taste. Willis then scored on a short drive with 35 seconds left, the Coffee Makers became a little too lax and Ricardo Brown snapped off a jumper that was too strong it bounced off the ring right into the hands of Abet Guidaben, a lead pass to Arturo Cristobal, who spotted Freddie Hubalde waiting in the frontcourt and scored with 4.4 seconds on the clock. Great Taste calls two timeouts and in the inbound play, Jeff Collins broke free and went for a three-pointer that was short, the Redmanizers evened up the series at one game each.

From a 51-49 halftime edge in favor of Crispa, the Coffee Makers started the third period on an 8-0 run for a 57-51 lead as the Redmanizers were held scoreless in the first 1:36 of the second half. Philip Cezar scored on a lay-up that set off Crispa's own 11-2 blast that pushed them ahead, 62-59. With 1:26 left in the third quarter, Crispa got their first double-digit lead at 79-69. The Redmanizers went up by 14 points in the fourth quarter, 90-76, but Great Taste rallied to within 94-98 with still 5:28 remaining. A three-point play by Abet Guidaben off Alejo Alolor's fourth foul seal the Coffee Makers' fate and Philip Cezar followed that up with a lay-up on a four on one fastbreak, 103-94 for Crispa.

The Coffee Makers took a 47-36 advantage in the second quarter but the Redmanizers came back and even lead at halftime, 57-54. In the fourth quarter from a precarious 103-97 six-point edge for Great Taste, Jeff Collins did the scoring for the Coffee Makers in a three-minute span to settle the issue, 112-99.

Jeff Collins sparked three devastating spurts that opened a commanding 56-40 lead for the Coffee Makers late in the second quarter, a finishing 15-6 third quarter run by Great Taste put the game's outcome beyond doubt. Abet Guidaben of Crispa fouled out with 1:58 left in the third quarter to hasten the Redmanizers' downfall. Great Taste raced to a 28-point margin, 108-80 with 4:54 left in the final period.

References

PBA Invitational Championship
Invitational Championship